Drift Fence (reissued as Texas Desperadoes) is a 1936 American Western film, directed by Otho Lovering and released by Paramount Pictures.

The film's sets were designed by art director David S. Garber.

Cast
 Buster Crabbe as "Slinger" Dunn
 Katherine DeMille as Molly Dunn
 Tom Keene as Jim Travis
 Benny Baker as Jim Traft
 Leif Erickson as Curley Prentice
 Stanley Andrews as Clay Jackson
 Richard Carle as Sheriff Peter Bingham
 Irving Bacon as "Windy" Watkins, Traft Foreman
 Effie Ellsler as Grandma Dunn
 Jan Duggan as Carrie Bingham, Sheriff Bingham's sister
 Walter Long as Bev Wilson, Neighbor
 Richard Alexander as Seth Haverly, Jackson Henchman
 Budd Fine as Sam Haverly, Jackson Henchman
 Chester Gan as Clarence – Ranch Cook
 Jack Pennick as Weary – Camp Cook

References

External links
 
 

1936 films
1936 Western (genre) films
American Western (genre) films
American black-and-white films
Films based on works by Zane Grey
Films directed by Otho Lovering
Paramount Pictures films
1930s English-language films
1930s American films